1 Chronicles 25 is the twenty-fifth chapter of the Books of Chronicles in the Hebrew Bible or the First Book of Chronicles in the Old Testament of the Christian Bible. The book is compiled from older sources by an unknown person or group, designated by modern scholars as "the Chronicler", and had the final shape established in late fifth or fourth century BCE. This chapter records the organization and departments of Levite temple musicians, from three main families (verses 1–19) and the drawing of lots to allocate individual musicians' duties (verses 20–31). The whole chapter belongs to the section focusing on the kingship of David (1 Chronicles 9:35 to 29:30), which from chapter 22 to the end does not have parallel in 2 Samuel.

Text
This chapter was originally written in the Hebrew language. It is divided into 31 verses.

Textual witnesses
Some early manuscripts containing the text of this chapter in Hebrew are of the Masoretic Text tradition, which includes the Aleppo Codex (10th century), and Codex Leningradensis (1008).

Extant manuscripts of a Koine Greek translation known as the Septuagint, made in the last few centuries BCE, include Codex Vaticanus (B; B; 4th century), Codex Alexandrinus (A; A; 5th century) and Codex Marchalianus (Q; Q; 6th century).

Three families of musicians (25:1–6)
This section details the organization of the temple musicians who strictly belonged to the Levites (1 Chronicles 23:30–31; cf. 1 Chronicles 15:16–24; 16:4–6). There were three main musician families: Asaph, Jeduthun, and Heman, whose members would be organized into divisions. After returning from exile in Babylon occasionally all musicians are regarded as descendants of Asaph (Ezra 2:41; 3:10; Nehemiah 7:44). Nehemiah 11:17 and 1 Chronicles 9:15-16 mention both Asaph and Jeduthun, whereas a 'third tradition' speaks of three musicians comprising Asaph, Heman, and Ethan (1 Chronicles 6:44; 15:17,19). The similar way of writing both names helps the identification of Jeduthun and Ethan. The order of Asaph, Jeduthun, Heman probably reflects an older hierarchy, but the tone in this passage elevates the family of Heman as the largest ('according to the promise of God to exalt him', verse 5). The musician families are introduced with their duties, such as to prophecy (verses 1–3), and instruments, that their singing, playing, and the content of their psalms or music, can be viewed as in 1 Samuel 10:5 and 2 Kings 3:15 as emphasizing the 'close relationship between music and prophecy'. In 2 Chronicles 29:25 David gave an order, which was supported by two prophets (Gad and Nathan), to confirm permanent office of these Levites as temple musicians. Allusions to song and music as a kind of prophecy (verses 1–3; cf. 2 Chronicles 24:19–22) may be related to the tradition of regarding David as a 'prophet who composed the psalms through divine inspiration'.

Verse 1
Moreover David and the captains of the host separated to the service of the sons of Asaph, and of Heman, and of Jeduthun, who should prophesy with harps, with psalteries, and with cymbals: and the number of the workmen according to their service was:
"The captains of the host": is understood as 'those who superintended the order of temple worship' (1 Chronicles 22:17; 1 Chronicles 23:2; 1 Chronicles 24:6; cf. Numbers 4:3; Numbers 8:23). As a part of David's 'governmental apparatus', these officers (also interpreted as the 'leaders of the army') have a say in the organization of the singers. The term "host" or "army" refers to a rank for the Levites, an expression adopted from Numbers 4, for example, whereas  uses 'chiefs of the Levites', who 'select the musicians for their office'.
Asaph, Heman, and Jeduthun belonged respectively to the Gershon, Kohath, and Merarite families, which are the three branches of Levites.

Verse 5
All these were the sons of Heman the king’s seer in the words of God, to exalt his horn. For God gave Heman fourteen sons and three daughters.
"Seer": from Hebrew hōzèh, literally "gazer". Gad was called "David’s seer" in 1 Chronicles 21:9, whereas Jeduthun was called "the king’s seer" in  2 Chronicles 35:15 (in LXX: together with Asaph and Heman). The word rendered “seer” in 1 Chronicles 26:28 and 1 Samuel 9:9 is different (Hebrew: rō’èh).
"Exalt his horn": means "increase his power or influence".

Twenty-four divisions of musicians (25:7–31)
The allocation of 24 divisions of musicians resembles that of the priest, suggesting that 'sacrifice and music are closely intertwined' (cf. 23:29–30), but, unlike the priests, none of the names in the list can be proved to have existed in other texts. Four divisions from the family of Asaph (numbers 1, 3, 5, 7), six from the family of Jeduthun (numbers 2, 4, 8, 10, 12, 14), and 14 from the family of Heman (numbers 6, 9, 11, 13, 15–24). From the result it can be deduced that the lots were not placed separately by family, but all lots were placed in one urn, so after the lots of Asaph and Jeduthun were drawn, only sons of Heman remained. Each of the 24 musical divisions has 12 members (24 x 12 = 288).

Verse 8
 And they cast lots for their duty, the small as well as the great, the teacher with the student.
"Cast lots": A lottery is held to determine the 24 divisions (or "courses") of the musicians (or "singers"), as with the priests (1 Chronicles 24:5) and other Levites (1 Chronicles 24:31).

List of temple musician divisions

See also

Related Bible parts: Numbers 4, Numbers 8, Numbers 16, Deuteronomy 10, 1 Chronicles 6, 1 Chronicles 23,  1 Chronicles 24, Ezra 10

Notes

References

Sources

External links
 Jewish translations:
 Divrei Hayamim I - I Chronicles - Chapter 25 (Judaica Press) translation [with Rashi's commentary] at Chabad.org
 Christian translations:
 Online Bible at GospelHall.org (ESV, KJV, Darby, American Standard Version, Bible in Basic English)
 First Book of Chronicles Chapter 25. Bible Gateway

25